The Audubon Community School District is a public school district headquartered in Audubon, Iowa.

The majority of the district is in eastern Audubon County, with a smaller area in Guthrie County. The district serves Audubon, Gray, and the surrounding rural areas.

The school mascot is the Wheeler and the colors are red and white.

Eric Trager has served as superintendent since 2019, after serving eight years as the principal for the middle-high school.

Schools
The district operates two schools, both in Audubon:
Audubon Elementary School
Audubon Middle-High School

Audubon High School

Athletics
The Wheelers compete in the Western Iowa Conference in the following sports:
Cross Country
Volleyball
Football
Basketball
 Girls' 5-time State Champions (1921, 1922, 1923, 1924, 1999) 
Wrestling
Track and Field
Golf
 Boys' 3-time Class A State Champions (1967, 1970, 1971)
Soccer
Baseball
Softball

References

External links
 Audubon Community School District

School districts in Iowa
Education in Audubon County, Iowa
Education in Guthrie County, Iowa